María Fassi (born 25 March 1998) is a Mexican professional golfer who plays on the U.S.-based LPGA Tour.

Amateur career
Fassi represented Mexico at the 2014 Summer Youth Olympics and won the Mexican Women's Amateur in 2015, 2016 and 2018. In 2015, she won the Spirit International Amateur in Trinity, Texas, and was runner-up in the South American Women's Amateur. She played college golf at the University of Arkansas where she was 2018 WGCA First-Team All-American, SEC Golfer of the Year and ANNIKA Award winner, in addition to winning the 2019 NCAA Division I Women's Championship individual title and receiving the Honda Sports Award. She received sponsor's exemption to the Walmart NW Arkansas Championship in 2016 and 2018 and in total made six starts on the LPGA Tour as an amateur, including a T15 finish at the 2016 Lorena Ochoa Invitational.

In April 2019, she finished runner-up behind Jennifer Kupcho at the inaugural Augusta National Women's Amateur.

Professional career
Fassi, who earned her LPGA Tour card in December 2018 deferred membership until she was done with college, and competed as an amateur and turned professional in May 2019, making her professional debut at the 2019 U.S. Women's Open where she finished T12.

Waiting for the 2020 LPGA Tour to resume following the coronavirus pandemic break, Fassi decided to keep her game sharp by entering the Cooper Communities NWA Classic, a Women's All Pro Tour event in Arkansas. She claimed a wire-to-wire, four-shot victory, her first as a professional.

Amateur wins
2015 Mexican Women's Amateur, Spirit International Amateur
2016 Mexican Women's Amateur, Lady Puerto Rico Classic 
2017 ANNIKA Intercollegiate, Mason Rudolph Women's Championship
2018 NCAA Women's South Regional, Darius Rucker Intercollegiate, Lady Puerto Rico Classic, Mexican Women's Amateur
2019 SEC Individual Champion, NCAA Women's Division I Individual Champion
Source:

Professional wins (1)

Other wins (1)
2020 Cooper Communities NWA Classic (Women's All Pro Tour)

Results in LPGA majors
Results not in chronological order before 2019.

CUT = missed the half-way cut
NT = no tournament
T= tied

Team appearances
Espirito Santo Trophy (representing Mexico): 2016, 2018

Collegiate honors
2018 WGCA First-team All-American
2018 First-team All-SEC
2018 SEC Women's Golf Player of the Year
2018 ANNIKA Award winner
2019 Honda Sport Award for Golf winner
2019 ANNIKA Award winner
2019 Ping WGCA Player of the Year
2019 SEC Female Athlete of the Year
2019 WGCA First-team All-American
2019 Golfweek First-team All-American
2019 SEC Women's Golf Player of the Year
2019 First-team All-SEC
2019 WGCA All-American Scholar
Source:

References

External links

Mexican female golfers
LPGA Tour golfers
Olympic golfers of Mexico
Golfers at the 2020 Summer Olympics
Golfers at the 2014 Summer Youth Olympics
Arkansas Razorbacks women's golfers
Sportspeople from Pachuca
1998 births
Living people